Gelbison may refer to:

Gelbison, an Australian pop rock band based in Sydney
Gelbison Cilento S.S.D., an Italian football club based in Vallo della Lucania
Mount Gelbison, an Italian mountain of Campania region located in the middle of Cilento